The Commissioners of Woods, Forests and Land Revenues were officials under the United Kingdom Crown, charged with the management of Crown lands. Their office were customarily known as the Office of Woods.

Under the Act of Parliament 14 and 15 Vict Cap 42 they took over from the Commissioners of Woods, Forests, Land Revenues, Works, and Buildings those functions which related to the revenue-earning parts of the Crown lands. In 1924 the royal forests including the New Forest and Forest of Dean were transferred from the Office of Woods to the new Forestry Commission, and the title of the Commissioners of Woods, Forests and Land Revenues was changed to Commissioners of Crown Lands.

Commissioners of Woods, Forests and Land Revenues

1851	Hon. Charles Alexander Gore & Thomas Francis Kennedy
1851	Hon. Charles Alexander Gore & Hon. James Howard
1882	Hon. Charles Alexander Gore & Sir Henry Loch
1884	Hon. Charles Alexander Gore & George Culley
1885	Robert Kingscote & George Culley
1893	Robert Kingscote & Stafford Howard 
1895	John Francis Fortescue Horner & Stafford Howard
1908	George Leveson-Gower & Stafford Howard
1912	Sir Stafford Howard retired and his duties were shared between the President of the Board of Agriculture and G Leveson Gower until 1924.

References

Lists of British people
Land management in the United Kingdom
Defunct ministerial offices in the United Kingdom
Defunct forestry agencies